Larry Izamoje (born 24 February 1962) is a radio host focusing on sports radio in Nigeria. He founded Sports Radio 88.9 Brila FM in Lagos, Nigeria, in 2002. Born in Onitsha, Nigeria, he is the fourth child in a family of nine. He is married, with three children.

Early life
Izamoje attended the Institute of Continuing Education, Warri before attending the University of Lagos from 1981 to 1984, graduating with a Bachelor of Science (second Class Upper Honours) degree in Sociology. He did his National Youth Service Corps (NYSC) service in Kano State and was a recipient of the Kano State NYSC award for excellence. He was a member of the editorial board of the Kano State NYSC Newsletter during his 1984/85 service year. Izamoje returned to school to receive a Master of Science degree in Sociology in 1986 from the University of Lagos and got a doctorate degree in 2012 from the Business School, Lausanne, Switzerland.

Early career
On returning to the University of Lagos in 1985 for his master's degree, Izamoje worked as a freelance reporter under Ernest Okonkwo at the Federal Radio Corporation of Nigeria (FRCN). From 1986 to 1990, Izamoje was in the employ of Concord Press, serving as a sports reporter, promotions executive, and Deputy sports editor. He joined the now defunct Mail newspaper as sports editor in late 1990 and worked briefly at DBN-TV Lagos before setting up Brila Sports, an independent production and sports consultancy company, with a second hand table and chair and a second hand typewriter, in 1992.

Brila FM
Izamoje founded Sports Radio 88.9 Brila FM and has been the chairman and CEO, Nigeria and Africa's first sports radio station, went on the air in 2002. Izamoje opened his second station at Mpape Hill Abuja in January 2007. In 2011, Larry Izamoje hit another milestone when Sports Radio 88.9 Brila FM opened its Kaduna and Onitsha stations as it continues its rapid expansion programme.

Awards and organisations
In 2007, Izamoje was honoured by the University of Lagos Alumni Association for his contributions to the Nigerian society through sports journalism. 

Izamoje won the NYSC Merit Award for Kano State in 1985, Sportswriter of the Year award (1995) from the Sports Writers Association of Nigeria (SWAN), the NUJ/UAC award for excellence in journalism 1988, Lagos Football Referees Society award for excellence in journalism 2002, Success Digest Male Entrepreneur of the year award 2002, 21st Century award for achievement in pioneering Sports Radio in Nigeria (2003), TeloComm Humanity award for service to the disabled in 2003 through 2006, International Foundation for Excellence award for contribution to mankind and nation building (2003), and Sports Writer of the Year award from Sporting Champion in 2004. He was an Olympic Torch bearer in Cairo in June 2004 when the Olympic Torch made its first visit to Africa since the inception of the modern Olympics. In April 2005 he was named an alumni exhibition and seminar attendee by the American National Association of Broadcasters, Las Vegas.

Izamoje is a recipient of the 2005 excellence award of the national body of the Sportswriters association of Nigeria (SWAN). 

Izamoje was media committee member, LOC of Nigeria '99 World Youth Championship; Marketing Committee member, LOC of Africa Cup of Nations 2000; a member of the pro-league review committee in 2000; a member of the Task force for Super Eagles preparation for the 2000 Nations Cup; a member of the All-Africa Games logo selection committee in 2001; Chairman of the Nigerian Football Summit planning committee in 2002; and a member of the Event Analysis team, Abuja 2003.

Widely travelled, he was the only African journalist that covered the historic Marvin Hagler/Sugar Ray Leonard bout in Las Vegas in 1987, and with his wife the only Africans that attended the global Sports Radio Conference, San Diego in 2002. He was between 1999 and 2002 a regular attendee of the global Football Expo held yearly in Cannes.

He has covered the Nations cup, World Cup, Commonwealth Games and the Wimbledon tennis championships.  Izamoje was a member of the 12-man Presidential Committee charged by the then Nigerian leader, President Umaru Yar'Adua, to ensure Nigeria's qualification for and participation in the South Africa 2010 World Cup.

Izamoje is a member of the Nigerian Institute of Public Relations (NIPR), Advertising Practitioners Council of Nigeria (APCON), Institute of Directors (IOD), International Sports Journalists Union (AIPS), Independent Broadcasters Association of Nigeria (IBAN) and the Broadcasting Organizations of Nigeria (BON). Brila-FM is an affiliate of the Voice of America (VOA) and the only station in West Africa running health programmes from the Mayo Clinic. Early in 2012, he obtained a DBA degree of the Business School, Lausanne, Switzerland on completion of his research on Changing Work Values and Small & Medium Organisations in Lagos, Nigeria
He was inducted a fellow of the Nigerian Chartered Institute of Administrators and Researchers (CFIAR) in March 2013.

References

External links
 Brila FM website
 Portrait
 "Nigeria: As a Child, My Swimming Pool Was the Murky Waters of the Village – Izamoje" (All Africa)
 "Nigeria: Izamoje's Metamorphosis!" (Vanguard via All Africa)
 "Unpublished confession of Larry Izamoje" (Naija Standard Newspaper)
 Advertisers did not like our business idea — Izamoje
 "Izamoje mourns murdered brother" (Entertainment Express)
 "Nigeria will not reverse team ban – source" (Reuters)
 "Salem University honours Larry Izamoje" (Vanguard)
 Alumni seminar with Larry Izamoje (SMC.edu)
 "Lary Izamoje of 88.9 Brilla FM says “On The Road to Your Dreams There Are Three P’s” (Under35 CEO)

Nigerian television journalists
Nigerian radio company founders
Living people
1962 births
University of Lagos alumni
People from Onitsha